"Zero 76" is an instrumental track by Dutch DJs Tiësto and Hardwell. It was released on 7 February 2011 in the Netherlands and the United Kingdom on iTunes. It is the second single from the Tiësto mixed compilation Club Life, Vol. 1 - Las Vegas and the first single from the Hardwell mixed compilation Hardwell Presents Revealed Volume 2. The song's title is a reference to the phone code for their home town Breda (076).

Music video 
The music video premiered on Tiësto's official YouTube Channel on 25 February 2011.

Track listing 
Digital Download (MF001)
 "Zero 76" (Original Mix) - 6:06

Free digital download
 "Zero 76" (twoloud Remix) - 4:42

2017 Translucent Hot Pink 7"
 "Zero 76" (Extended Mix) - 6:06
 "Zero 76" (Radio Edit) - 3:13

Charts

References

2011 songs
2011 singles
Tiësto songs
Songs written by Tiësto
Trance instrumentals
Songs written by Hardwell